The 2000 Tulane Green Wave football team represented Tulane University in the 2000 NCAA Division I-A football season. The Green Wave played their home games at the Louisiana Superdome. They competed in Conference USA. The team was coached by head coach Chris Scelfo.

Schedule

Roster

After the season

The 2001 NFL Draft was held on April 21–22, 2001. The following Green Wave player was selected.

References

Tulane
Tulane Green Wave football seasons
Tulane Green Wave football